Lambda Arietis (λ Ari, λ Arietis) is the Bayer designation for a double star in the northern constellation of Aries. Based upon an annual parallax shift of 25.32 arcseconds, this system is approximately  distant from Earth. The pair have a combined apparent visual magnitude of 4.79, which is bright enough to be viewed with the naked eye. Because the yellow secondary is nearly three magnitudes fainter than the white primary, they are a challenge to split with quality 7× binoculars and are readily resolvable at 10×.

The brighter component is an F-type main sequence star with a visual magnitude of 4.95 and a stellar classification of F0 V. At an angular separation of 37.4 arcseconds is fainter, magnitude 7.75 companion. This is a G-type main sequence star with a classification of G1 V.

References

References
 HR 569
 Image Lambda Arietis

011973
Binary stars
009153
Arietis, Lambda
Arietis, 09
Aries (constellation)
F-type main-sequence stars
0569
Durchmusterung objects